Chapleau station is an unstaffed station located in the heart of Chapleau, Ontario. This is a major intermediate stop for Via Rail's Sudbury – White River train, operating in between Sudbury and White River.

References

Via Rail stations in Ontario
Railway stations in Sudbury District
Canadian Pacific Railway stations in Ontario